Mother is a 2016 Estonian drama film directed by Kadri Kõusaar. It was selected as the Estonian entry for the Best Foreign Language Film at the 89th Academy Awards but it was not nominated.

Cast
 Tiina Mälberg as Mother
 Andres Tabun as Father
 Andres Noormets as Aarne
 Siim Maaten as Lauri
 Jaak Prints as Andres
 Rea Lest as Riin
 Jaan Pehk as Policeman
 Getter Meresmaa as Kimberly
 Katrin Kalma as Liina
 Marin Mägi-Efert as Sister
 Margus Mikomägi as Ranger
 Liis Laigna as Doctor
 Märten Matsu as Karl-Andreas

See also
 List of submissions to the 89th Academy Awards for Best Foreign Language Film
 List of Estonian submissions for the Academy Award for Best Foreign Language Film

References

External links
 

2016 films
2016 drama films
Estonian drama films
Estonian-language films